Lauren Louise Dolan (born 19 September 1999) is a British former professional racing cyclist, who most recently rode for UCI Women's Continental Team . In September 2017, Dolan crashed heavily during the junior time trial event at the 2017 UCI Road World Championships, but went on to finish the race. A motorist's actions in September 2019 caused her to sustain multiple serious injuries which ultimately ended her career.

Major results
2019
 3rd  Mixed team relay, UCI Road World Championships

References

External links

1999 births
Living people
English female cyclists
Sportspeople from Exeter
21st-century English women